Ralph Willis AO (born 14 April 1938) is a former Australian politician who served as a Cabinet Minister during the entirety of the Hawke-Keating Government from 1983 to 1996, most notably as Treasurer of Australia from 1993 to 1996 and briefly in 1991. He also served as Minister for Industrial Relations, Minister for Transport and Communications and Minister for Finance. He represented the Victorian seat of Gellibrand in the House of Representatives from 1972 to 1998.

Early life
Willis was born in Melbourne to Stan and Doris Willis and educated at Footscray Central School, University High School and Melbourne University, gaining a Bachelor of Commerce. He subsequently worked as a research officer and industrial advocate for the Australian Council of Trade Unions (ACTU) during the time that Bob Hawke was ACTU President. He and his wife Carol Willis (née Dawson) have three children, Sandra, Fiona and Evan.

Political career
In 1972, the year that the Whitlam Government was elected, Willis was elected to the House of Representatives for the safe Labor seat of Gellibrand in Melbourne's western suburbs. After Labor's defeat at the 1975 election, Willis was appointed to the Shadow Cabinet, serving initially as Shadow Minister for Industrial Relations, and from 1980 as Shadow Treasurer. In January 1983, however, he was replaced as Shadow Treasurer by Opposition Leader Bill Hayden, who gave the position to Paul Keating in an unsuccessful attempt to shore up his own position as party leader.

Hawke Government
As a former ACTU official, Willis was regarded as a protégé of Bob Hawke, and some expected Hawke to make him Treasurer upon his election as Prime Minister in March 1983. However Hawke decided to appoint Paul Keating to the role instead, making Willis the Minister for Employment Relations and giving him a major role in establishing and overseeing the Prices and Incomes Accord, one of the central policy reforms of the Hawke Government. Willis retained this role following the 1984 and 1987 elections, before being appointed Minister for Transport and Communications in 1988.

After the 1990 election, Willis became Minister for Finance. Following Keating's resignation as Treasurer in June 1991 in an unsuccessful attempt to challenge Hawke for the leadership, there was media speculation that Willis would be given the role, but he was passed over a second time when Hawke ultimately decided to appoint John Kerin. However, Kerin's period as Treasurer was troubled, and after Hawke was forced to sack Kerin for making a public gaffe in December 1991, Willis was finally appointed to the role of Treasurer in his place.

Keating Government
Willis's initial time as Treasurer was brief as Paul Keating launched a second and this time successful challenege to Hawke, just three weeks later. Keating had long promised to appoint his close political ally John Dawkins as Treasurer, and so Keating moved Willis back to the role of Finance Minister in order to accommodate this. Willis retained the role after Labor unexpectedly won a fifth consecutive election in 1993, and was expected to remain in the role until the sudden resignation of Dawkins in December 1993, who had grown frustrated with the role. Willis was duly appointed as Treasurer for a second time by Keating, and was responsible for helping to roll-out the Government's major 'One Nation' economic package on which it had won the 1993 election, including a round of middle-income tax cuts and the establishment of a national infrastructure commission.

Willis remained as Treasurer until the 1996 election, which Labor heavily lost; in the weeks before the election, Willis chose to unilaterally release a letter purportedly written by Liberal Victorian Premier Jeff Kennett, which suggested that a Coalition Government led by John Howard would cut grants to the states. However, media examination quickly revealed the letter to be a forgery, allegedly foisted on Willis by Melbourne University Liberal Club students. This successful ruse had a significantly adverse impact upon the last week of Labor's campaign.

After the 1996 election, Willis chose to move to the backbench and announced his retirement from Parliament prior to the 1998 election. Willis was one of only three people to be a member of the Cabinet continuously during the Hawke-Keating Government between 1983 and 1996, the other two being Kim Beazley and Gareth Evans. At the time of his retirement from Parliament, Willis was the only MP from the time of the Whitlam Government still serving. Following his retirement from politics, Willis has served on several boards of companies and charities.

Honours
Willis was awarded the Centenary Medal in 2001 for long service to the Commonwealth Parliament. On 13 June 2011, he was named an Officer of the Order of Australia for distinguished service to the Parliament of Australia, particularly in the areas of economic development and industrial relations, to the superannuation industry, and to the community.

On 2 June 2009, Willis was conferred with the degree of doctor of the university Honoris Causa from Victoria University for services to Australia and in particular the Western Suburbs of Melbourne.

Sources

References

1938 births
Living people
Australian Labor Party members of the Parliament of Australia
Members of the Cabinet of Australia
Treasurers of Australia
Members of the Australian House of Representatives for Gellibrand
Members of the Australian House of Representatives
Officers of the Order of Australia
Recipients of the Centenary Medal
People educated at University High School, Melbourne
Keating Government
20th-century Australian politicians
Government ministers of Australia